Sibe Mardešić (June 20, 1927 - June 18, 2016) was a Croatian mathematician.

Life and education

Sibe Mardešić was born in June 1927, in Bergedorf (near Hamburg, Germany), where his parents temporarily resided before moving to Chile. After that, they returned to Split, where he completed elementary school and high school. Soon after World War II he went to Zagreb to study mathematics. After graduation he took a job as an assistant at the Department of Mathematics of the University of Zagreb, where he stayed until his retirement in 1991. He was a full member of the Croatian Academy of Arts and Sciences, a corresponding member of the Slovenian Academy of Sciences and Arts and a Fellow of the American Mathematical Society.

Work
Mardešić was a topologist who worked in all main branches of topology having published 148 research papers, 40 professional articles and 18 books. With Jack Segal, he developed an alternate approach to shape theory using inverse systems method of ANRs generalizing Borsuk's shape theory to include all compact Hausdorff spaces, independently of Tim Porter and Włodzimierz Holsztyński. Later he extended Holsztyński's theory for compact Hausdorff spaces to all topological spaces. He introduced the first factorization theorem in dimension theory, the Mardešić factorization theorem. With P. Papić he introduced the notion of feebly compact spaces.

He died on June 18, 2016 in Zagreb.

References

Selected publications
 
 
 
 
 
 
 S. Mardesic (1978). "Shape theory". Proceedings of the International Congress of Mathematicians. 
 S. Mardesic; J. Segal (1982). "Shape theory". Elsevier.

1927 births
2016 deaths
Yugoslav mathematicians
Faculty of Science, University of Zagreb alumni
Members of the Croatian Academy of Sciences and Arts
Fellows of the American Mathematical Society
Topologists
20th-century Croatian mathematicians